The 2023 New Orleans Breakers season is scheduled to be the New Orleans Breakers second season in the United States Football League, their second at Protective Stadium, and their first under head coach/general manager tandem of John DeFilippo and Ryan Jones. For the 2023 season, they will attempt to improve upon their 6–4 record from the previous season and make it to the USFL Championship Game after being knocked out in the first round of the playoffs last season.

Offseason

Stadium plans
Shortly before the completion of the 2022 season, the USFL announced plans to move into two or four hubs for teams to play in. In November, the USFL was reportedly exploring options of having a hub in Metro Detroit, with possible locations being the Eastern Michigan Eagles' Rynearson Stadium and the Detroit Lions' Ford Field.

It was announced that the Breakers would be playing their games in Birmingham for the 2nd straight season. They share a hub with their South Division rivals, the Birmingham Stallions.

Draft 
The Breakers clinched the fifth overall pick in the 2023 USFL Draft and hold the fifth pick in each round.

The draft only included players that were 2023 draft eligible, contrasting with last years' draft which was to build rosters. Also differing from the 2022 draft, players weren't initially contracted with the USFL prior to the Draft, meaning teams have to negotiate with players to retain their rights. As of February 26, 2023, no player drafted by the New Orleans Breakers has signed a contract with the team.

Additions

Subtractions

Personnel

Roster
The Breakers, like all other teams, have a 38-man active roster with a 7-man practice squad.

Staff

Schedule
The Breakers 2023 schedule was revealed February 7. They will open the season at home against the Pittsburgh Maulers.

Regular Season

Standings

References 

New Orleans
2023 in sports in Louisiana
New Orleans Breakers (2022)